John Knox (1880-1964) was a Scotland international rugby union player

Rugby Union career

Amateur career

Knox played for Kelvinside Academicals.

Provincial career

He was capped by Glasgow District in 1898 playing in the  Inter-City match against Edinburgh District.

International career

He was capped 3 times for the Scotland international side, all in 1903.

Referee career

After his playing career ended, Knox became a referee. Resident in Argentina, he refereed for the Argentine Rugby Union.

References

1880 births
1964 deaths
Glasgow District (rugby union) players
Kelvinside Academicals RFC players
Rugby union players from Prestwick
Scotland international rugby union players
Scottish rugby union players
Rugby union scrum-halves